Vouleftiria is an area of Mount Athos that belongs to the Monastery of Great Lavra. Located directly downhill from the main area of the Skete of Saint Anne, it is served by the port (arsanas) of Saint Anne (Agia Anna). There are several kellia in Vouleftiria.

References

Populated places in Mount Athos
Great Lavra